Roger Gössner (born 11 November 1964) is a German former wrestler. He competed in the men's Greco-Roman 82 kg at the 1988 Summer Olympics.

References

External links
 

1964 births
Living people
German male sport wrestlers
Olympic wrestlers of West Germany
Wrestlers at the 1988 Summer Olympics
Sportspeople from Ludwigshafen